Exitianus is a genus of leafhoppers in the family Cicadellidae. There are more than 50 described species in Exitianus.

Species
These 52 species belong to the genus Exitianus:

 Exitianus abruptus DeLong & Hershberger, 1947
 Exitianus africanus Walker, 1851
 Exitianus angulatus DeLong & Hershberger, 1947
 Exitianus apophysiosus Zahniser, 2008
 Exitianus apophysisiosus Zahniser, 2008
 Exitianus arenaceus Villiers, 1956
 Exitianus armus Ball
 Exitianus atratus Linnavuori, 1959
 Exitianus attenuatus Ross, 1968
 Exitianus brevis DeLong & Hershberger, 1947
 Exitianus brunneopictus Zanol, 1987
 Exitianus capicola Stål, 1855
 Exitianus centralis Ghauri, 1974
 Exitianus coronatus Distant, 1918
 Exitianus curvipenis Ghauri, 1972
 Exitianus distanti Ross, 1968
 Exitianus evansi McKamey & Hicks, 2007
 Exitianus excavatus DeLong & Hershberger, 1947
 Exitianus exitiosa Uhler, 1880
 Exitianus exitiosus (Uhler, 1880) (gray lawn leafhopper)
 Exitianus fasciolatus (Melichar, 1911)
 Exitianus frontalis Distant, 1917
 Exitianus fusconervosus Motschulsky, 1863
 Exitianus ghaurii Zahniser, 2008
 Exitianus greensladei Ross, 1968
 Exitianus indicus Distant, 1908
 Exitianus karachiensis Ahmed & M., 1986
 Exitianus kinoanus Ball
 Exitianus kumaonis Baker, 1925
 Exitianus luctuosus Stål, 1895
 Exitianus major Ahmed, M. & Qadeer
 Exitianus minor Ahmed, M. & Qadeer
 Exitianus mucronatus Ross, 1968
 Exitianus nanus Distant, 1908
 Exitianus natalensis Ross, 1968
 Exitianus nigrens DeLong & Hershberger, 1947
 Exitianus obscurinervis Stål, 1859
 Exitianus occidentalis Ghauri, 1974
 Exitianus okahandia Ross, 1968
 Exitianus peshawarensis Ahmed, M. & Rao, 1986
 Exitianus picatus (Gibson, 1919)
 Exitianus plebeius Kirkaldy, 1906
 Exitianus pondus Ross, 1968
 Exitianus quadratulus Osborn, 1923
 Exitianus selbyi Evans, 1938
 Exitianus simillimus Matsumura, 1914
 Exitianus spinosus Zanol, 1987
 Exitianus transversalis Matsumura, 1908
 Exitianus tricolor DeLong & Hershberger, 1947
 Exitianus turneri Ross, 1968
 Exitianus upenis Ghauri, 1972
 Exitianus zuluensis Ross, 1968

References

External links

 

Chiasmini
Cicadellidae genera
Articles created by Qbugbot